Naomi Bashkansky (born 2003), is an American chess player, a World Schools Chess Champion (Girls U13), a North American Junior Girls Under 20 Champion, and a Woman International Master.

Bashkansky won first place in the 2016 World Schools Chess Championship in Sochi, and became the 2017 North American Junior Girls Under 20 Champion in Dallas, TX.

Bashkansky won the US All-Girls National Chess Championships U10 (in 2013) and U12 (in 2015). She tied for first place in the 2013 Pan-American Youth Chess Championship in Brazil, in the Girls U10 category. In 2018 Bashkansky won the North American All Girls Championship.

Bashkansky graduated from Odle Middle School in 2017, from Newport High School (Bellevue, Washington) in 2021, and is now a Computer Science student at Harvard University.

References

External links
 
 
 

2003 births
Living people
American female chess players
Chess Woman International Masters
21st-century American women